Judge Skinner may refer to:

Roger Skinner (1773–1825), judge of the United States District Court for the Northern District of New York
Walter Jay Skinner (1927–2005), judge of the United States District Court for the District of Massachusetts

See also
Justice Skinner (disambiguation)